15 Orionis is a suspected astrometric binary star system in the equatorial constellation of Orion, near the border with Taurus. It is visible to the naked eye as a faint, yellow-white hued star with an apparent visual magnitude of 4.82. The system is approximately 340 light years away from the Sun based on parallax. It is moving further from the Earth with a heliocentric radial velocity of +29 km/s, having come to within  some three million years ago.

The primary component is an early F-type subgiant star with a stellar classification of F2 IV, a star that has exhausted the hydrogen at its core and has begun to evolve into a giant. It has 3.42 times the mass of the Sun and 5.9 times the Sun's radius. The star still has a relatively high rotation rate, showing a projected rotational velocity of 60 km/s. It is radiating 300 times the luminosity of the Sun from its expanding photosphere at an effective temperature of 7,161 K.

It has one suspected companion, component B, at a separation of 0.3".

References

F-type subgiants
Astrometric binaries
Orion (constellation)
BD+15 752
Orionis, 15
033276
024010
1676
Southern pole stars